Vaettiya Madichu Kattu is a 1998 Indian Tamil-language film written and directed by K. Bhagyaraj. The film stars himself in lead role with his real-life son Shantanu portraying his son with Nagma and Saikumar playing supporting roles. The film was remade in Hindi as Papa The Great (2000) and in Kannada as Vishalakshammana Ganda (2001).

Plot
Jaiprakash BE (Bhagyaraj) is a cowardly engineer working with Bharat Shipping Company in Mumbai. He lives with his wife and his son (Shanthanu). One day, he meets a fellow Tamilian (SS Chandran) who is in Mumbai to search for his sister and brother-in-law, who later turn out to be thieves. He gives him shelter for few days in his house. Later, Jaiprakash sees a murder committed by Raaka (Satya Prakash), and testifies against him in the court, after which Raaka challenges to kill him and later escapes from the jail. Meanwhile, Muthupandi (Saikumar) stays in Jai's house pretending to be his and Pooja's uncle in front of either of them. Later it is revealed that Muthupandi was invited to Mumbai by SS Chandran, who wanted to pay for the gratitude Jai had done to him. In a celebration during Holi festival Muthupandi is forced to drink Bhaang by Jai and others. He gets stabbed twice in an attempt to protect Jai from Raaka and kills one of Raaka's men in the process. On persuasion from his wife, Jai decides to leave for Chennai along with his family forever, and arranges to pay for Muthupandi's treatment, leaving SS Chandran to take care of him.

As Jaiprakash is about to leave his colony with his wife and son, Raaka arrives along with his men to kill him. He is accosted by Sonu, Jai's son, who has been perceiving his father as a brave and courageous man all along. Sonu calls Jai to fight Raaka and his men. Jai's wife asks him to run away, but Jai, who feels that his son will be a coward all his life if he runs away, steps forward bravely to face Raaka without fearing for his life. He defeats all of Raaka'a men and breaks both of Raaka's hands in a fight. Muthupandi, who has arrived from the hospital, then wishes Jai good luck for the rest of his life. The film ends with Jai and Sonu hugging each other.

Cast
K. Bhagyaraj as Jaiprakash BE
Nagma as Pooja Jaiprakash
Shantanu Bhagyaraj as Sonu
Saikumar as Madurai Muthupandi
Bayilvan Ranganathan
S. S. Chandran
Razak Khan
 Satya Prakash as Raaka
Junior Balaiah
Anil Dhawan
Mahavir Shah
Pallavi

Production
The film was initially planned as a bilingual in Tamil and Hindi, though the latter version was shelved following the assassination of Gulshan Kumar, who had agreed to produce the film.

Soundtrack
Soundtrack was composed by Deva and lyrics written by Pa. Vijay and Mayilvaganan.

References

External links
 

1998 films
Indian action comedy films
Tamil films remade in other languages
1990s Tamil-language films
Films directed by K. Bhagyaraj
Films scored by Deva (composer)
1998 action comedy films